Manfred Ahne (born 2 June 1961) is a West German ice hockey player. He competed in the 1984 Winter Olympics.

References

External links
 

1961 births
Living people
Ice hockey players at the 1984 Winter Olympics
West German ice hockey forwards
Olympic ice hockey players of West Germany
People from Wunsiedel (district)
Sportspeople from Upper Franconia
Starbulls Rosenheim players
German ice hockey forwards